The Battle of Temzezdekt was a battle that took place in 1327,‎‎ near the fortress of ,‎‎ not far from the city of Béjaïa in Algeria, between the Hafsid general Abu Abdallah Ibn Seid en-Nas against the army of the Zayanids commanded by Moussa Ibn Ali.

Context‎‎ 
In 1326,‎‎ the Zayanid sultan‎‎ Abu Tashfîn‎‎ ordered Musa Ibn Ali Al-Kurdi, commander of his army, to invade the Hafsid territories. The latter attacked Constantine‎‎ and devastated the neighboring lands, then turned to ‎‎Bejaia‎‎ and besieged it.‎‎ However, he soon lifted the camp  in order to find a better position from which to besiege the city; it was in a place called Souk-el Khamis, in the valley of Bejaïa,‎‎ that the Zayinid general decided to build a ‎‎fortress‎‎ in order to continue the blockade‎‎ on Béjaïa. This fortress was completed in forty days and took the name of ‎‎Temzezdekt.

The battle 
In 1327, the Hafsid caliph Abu Yahya Abu Bakr sent an army under the command of Abu Abdallah Ibn Seid en-Nas, against the fortress of Temzezdekt. Moussa Al-Kurdi learns of their approach and gathers his troops, the two armies meeting near the fortress and the battle ending in a defeat of the Hafsids.

Consequences 
‎The defeat of Abu Abdallah led to the capture of his camp by the Zaynids and the death of the leader of the Christian converts who guarded the port of the ruler of Tunis, Dafer el-Kebir. Abu Abdallah then locks himself behind the gates of Bejaia.

See also 

 Siege of Béjaïa (1326-1329)
 Battle of er Rias
 Capture of Tunis (1329)

References 

Conflicts in 1327
14th century in Africa